A deputy leadership election for the Labour Party in the United Kingdom took place in 1994, after the sudden death of incumbent leader John Smith. Margaret Beckett was the serving Deputy Leader of the Labour Party, having been elected in 1992, and following Smith's death became the acting leader. On 25 May she announced that a contest for the deputy leadership would take place alongside the leadership election, which allowed her to stand for both positions.

Nominations opened on 10 June and ballot papers were sent out on 30 June. Elections were held concurrently for both Leader and Deputy Leader of the Party, with the results announced on 21 July 1994. There were three candidates for Leader: Margaret Beckett, Tony Blair and John Prescott, but out of these three, only Blair did not simultaneously stand for Deputy Leader. Blair went on to win the leadership election, and Prescott won the deputy leadership.  Both Prescott and Beckett held roles in Blair's cabinet for his entire time in office.

Candidates
 Margaret Beckett, incumbent Deputy Leader of the Labour Party, Member of Parliament for Derby South
 John Prescott, Shadow Secretary of State for Employment, Member of Parliament for Kingston upon Hull East

Result
The election was conducted using the Labour Party's new "electoral college" which gave a third of the votes to the party's MPs and MEPs, a third to its rank and file members (the CLP) and the final third to affiliated trade unions and societies, such as the Fabians.

How each MP voted

See also
1994 Labour Party leadership election

References

Leadership Selection and Party Renewal, Universities of Toronto & Essex

1994
1994 elections in the United Kingdom
Labour Party deputy leadership election